The Dewoitine 14 was a mid-1920s French civil transport, capable of carrying mixture of passengers and freight. The sole example was used in commercial trials.

Design and development

Dewoitine aircraft, gliders and ultralights apart, had generally been metal-framed but the all-wood  D.14  was an exception. Designed as a civil transport, it could carry up to six passengers or a mixture of passengers and freight.

It was a high wing monoplane with a two part, straight-edged, unswept wing of constant chord out to angled tips. Each half-wing was built around two spars and was fabric covered. On each side a pair of faired struts braced the spars to the lower fuselage longerons. Its overhung  ailerons were aerodynamically balanced.

The D.14 was powered by a  Lorraine 12E Courlis W12 engine, water-cooled with a pair of Lamblin radiators. Part of the fuel was in wing tanks and part in the fuselage.  The engine was enclosed under a closely fitted cowling which followed the three banks of cylinders. Behind the engine the fuselage had a rectangular cross-section defined by four longerons. The pilot's open cockpit, offset to port, was in the wing leading edge. The central, windowed part of the fuselage contained passengers and freight and was divided into three compartments. The forward one, under the wing, could either be given over to freight or contain two passenger seats. A central compartment provided four seats and the rearmost contained a toilet and had separate entry doors to the cabin and a baggage hold.  

The empennage was conventional with a swept, straight-edged tailplane mounted on top of the fuselage and a triangular fin. Both rudder and elevator were balanced, the latter with overhung tips like those of the ailerons.

The D.14 had conventional, fixed landing gear. The forward components of the V-struts were telescopic, with shock absorbers and coil springs inside their streamlined fairings.

Operational history

The D.14 first appeared in public, still unflown, at the Paris Aero Salon held in December 1924. In January it was at Villacoublay, with trials scheduled to begin in the week starting 20 January. It had flown by 4 February 1925.

In December 1925 the D.14 was about to start commercial trials  with CIDNA, fitted with a  Farman 12We W-12 engine. The following May it was tested at Toussus-le-Noble, its performance reported as "much improved" because the geared-down Farman engine had allowed a larger diameter propeller to be fitted. In August 1926 it was at Villacoublay, still with this engine, now reported as delivering .

Specifications

References

1920s French airliners
D.14
High-wing aircraft
Single-engined tractor aircraft
Aircraft first flown in 1925